Jim Cassidy (born 21 January 1963), often referred to as "Jimmy" is a retired New Zealand jockey who has been inducted in both the Australian Racing Hall of Fame and the New Zealand Racing Hall of Fame.

Jimmy's career and life

Jim Cassidy was one of seven children of Arthur "Blue" and Francie Cassidy of Wellington, New Zealand. 
  
Cassidy initially rode in New Zealand with Pat Campbell in the Hawkes Bay, having over 500 winners in his country of birth. He achieved even greater success in Australia.

Cassidy rode Kiwi from last into the straight to win the 1983 Melbourne Cup. He won his second Melbourne Cup in 1997 aboard Might and Power and they also won the following year's Cox Plate.

Cassidy has won the Australian Derby three times; in 1990, 1993 and in 2009.

Cassidy is the third jockey to win 100 group one races, winning his 100th race aboard Zoustar in the Coolmore Stud Stakes (1200m) at Flemington on Saturday 2 November 2013.

His older brother Ricki was an apprentice jockey to Trevor McKee and Larry V Cassidy, who is seven years younger than Jim, went on to be a Sydney Premiership winning jockey. Larry also started riding in New Zealand before moving to Australia, winning three Sydney premierships and later embarking on stints in Hong Kong, Singapore and Macau.  After returning to Australia, Larry continued his riding career in Queensland.

Jim Cassidy's daughter, Nicole, married Brisbane and Hong Kong champion jockey, Zac Purton.

Cassidy released his autobiography titled "Pumper" through Macmillan Books in October 2016.

Notable wins
The following are some of the races Jimmy won in New Zealand and Australia.

See also

 Thoroughbred racing in New Zealand
 Thoroughbred racing in Australia
 Lance O'Sullivan
 Shane Dye

References

Further reading

1963 births
Living people
Australian jockeys
New Zealand jockeys
Australian Thoroughbred Racing Hall of Fame inductees
People from Wellington City
Sportspeople from Wellington City
New Zealand Racing Hall of Fame inductees